Gheorghe Lazăr (1779-1823) was a Romanian scholar.

Gheorghe Lazăr may also refer to:

 George Lazăr (magazine), published in Bârlad, Romania  
 Gheorghe Lazăr, Ialomița, commune in Romania

See also
 Gheorghe Lazăr National College (disambiguation), two Romanian national colleges